A blastoderm (germinal disc, blastodisc) is a single layer of embryonic epithelial tissue that makes up the blastula. It encloses the fluid filled blastocoel. Gastrulation follows blastoderm formation, where the tips of the blastoderm begins the formation of the ectoderm, mesoderm, and endoderm.

Formation
The blastoderm is formed when the oocyte plasma membrane begins cleaving by invagination, creating multiple cells that arrange themselves into an outer sleeve to the blastocoel.

In oviparous
In chicken eggs, the blastoderm represents a flat disc after embryonic fertilization. At the edge of the blastoderm is the site of active migration by most cells.

See also
Blastodisc
Embryology
Cleavage
Gastrulation

References

 Campbell Reece, Biology 7th edition, Pearson Publishing, 2005

Embryology